Rochelle Majer Krich (born 1947) is a writer of mystery novels and winner of an Anthony Award and the Mary Higgins Clark Award.

Biography
Krich was born in Bayreuth, Germany but emigrated to the United States in 1951, moving to Los Angeles in 1960. Her parents were survivors of the Holocaust who met after the war, her father's first wife and daughters having been murdered in the camps.  She graduated in English from Stern College for Women and met her husband while studying for a master's at UCLA. She is married with six children and taught in an orthodox Jewish high school in Los Angeles for many years.

Her first published novel Where's Mommy Now? won the Anthony Award for best paperback original and was adapted into film in 1995 as Perfect Alibi, starring Teri Garr, Hector Elizondo, and Kathleen Quinlan.

Her first series is set in Los Angeles and concerns Jessie Drake, a divorced homicide detective who has a difficult relationship with her mother and sisters. In the second novel, Angel of Death, Jessie unexpectedly discovers that her mother is Jewish and that family members were murdered in the Holocaust. Her second series features Molly Blume, from an orthodox Jewish family.

Bibliography

Jessie Drake series
 Fair Game (Mysterious Press, 1993). 
 Angel of Death (Mysterious Press, 1994). 
 Blood Money (Avon Twilight, 1999). 
 Dead Air (Avon Twilight, 2000). 
 Shadows of Sin (William Morrow, 2001).

Molly Blume series
 Blues in the Night (Ballantine Books, 2002). 
 Dream House (Ballantine Books, 2003). 
 Grave Endings (Ballantine Books, 2004). 
 Now You See Me... (Ballantine Books, 2005).

Other novels
 Where's Mommy Now? (Pinnacle, 1990).   - Won 1991 Anthony Award for Best Paperback Original
 Till Death Do Us Part (Avon, 1992). 
 Nowhere to Run (Avon, 1994). 
 Speak No Evil (Mysterious Press, 1996). 
 Fertile Ground (Avon, 1998).

References

External links

1947 births
20th-century American novelists
21st-century American novelists
American mystery writers
American women novelists
Living people
Stern College for Women alumni
People from Bayreuth
German emigrants to the United States
Anthony Award winners
University of California, Los Angeles alumni
Jewish American novelists
Writers from Los Angeles
Women mystery writers
20th-century American women writers
21st-century American women writers
21st-century American Jews